This is a list of players who have played at least one game for the Dallas Stars (1993–94 to present) of the National Hockey League (NHL). This list does not include players from the Minnesota North Stars, Oakland Seals, California Golden Seals and Cleveland Barons of the NHL.

Key
  Appeared in a Stars game during the 2021–2022 season.
  Stanley Cup Champion, Hockey Hall of Famer, or retired number.

Note: Stats are updated through to the end of the 2021-2022 season

Goaltenders

Skaters

References
hockeydb.com

 
Dallas Stars
players